Air Commodore Roy Gilbert Dutton,  (2 March 1917 – 14 September 1988) was a Royal Air Force officer and decorated flying ace. He flew Hurricanes during the Second World War and was credited with 19 confirmed aerial victories.

Early life
Dutton was born on 2 March 1917 in Hatton, British Ceylon. He was educated in England.

Military career
On 24 August 1936, Dutton was commissioned into the Royal Air Force as an acting pilot officer (on probation). On 29 June 1937, his commission was confirmed and he was regraded to pilot officer. On 29 January 1939, he was promoted to flying officer.

On 18 May 1940, he shot down two Heinkel He 111s while on patrol over Belgium. The following day, on 19 May, he shot down an additional Heinkel He 111 while flying west of Arras, northern France. He was promoted to flight lieutenant on 3 September 1940. On 1 December 1941, he was promoted to squadron leader (temporary). He was promoted to substantive squadron leader on 9 December 1943. On 1 July 1944, he was promoted to wing commander (temporary).

He remained in the Royal Air Force following the end of the Second World War. On 1 September 1945, he was granted a permanent commission and the rank of squadron leader in the post-war RAF. He was later granted seniority in that rank from 1 June 1944. He relinquished the acting rank of wing commander on 1 November 1947. He was promoted to substantive wing commander on 1 July 1950 and to group captain on 1 July 1957.

He retired from the Royal Air Force on 3 December 1970 and was allowed to retain the rank of air commodore.

Honours and decorations
Dutton received a number of decorations during the Second World War. On 31 May 1940, he was awarded the Distinguished Flying Cross (DFC) "in recognition of gallantry displayed in flying operations against the enemy". On 20 August 1940, he was awarded a Bar to his Distinguished Flying Cross; this represents a second DFC. He was a recipient of the 1939–45 Star with Battle of Britain clasp. On 8 June 1945, he was awarded the Distinguished Service Order (DSO) "in recognition of gallantry and devotion to duty in the execution of air operations".

In the 1966 Queen's Birthday Honours, he was appointed a Commander of the Order of the British Empire (CBE). He was appointed Aide-de-Camp (ADC) to Queen Elizabeth II on 16 February 1965, and relinquished the appointment on 3 December 1970.

References

1917 births
1988 deaths
The Few
British World War II flying aces
People from Central Province, Sri Lanka
Commanders of the Order of the British Empire
Companions of the Distinguished Service Order
Royal Air Force air commodores
Recipients of the Distinguished Flying Cross (United Kingdom)
British expatriates in Sri Lanka
Royal Air Force pilots of World War II